The Illawarra Coal Measures is a group of sedimentary rocks occurring in the Sydney Basin in eastern Australia. This stratum is up to 150 metres thick. Formed in the Late Permian, it comprises shale, quartz-lithic sandstone, conglomerate rocks, and chert, with sporadically carbonaceous mudstone, coal and seams of torbanite. Coal mining of these measures remains a significant commercial enterprise to the present day. One of the abandoned coal mines in the Blue Mountains is now a tourist attraction.

See also
 Sydney Basin
 Hawkesbury sandstone
 Mittagong Formation
 Ashfield Shale
 Narrabeen group

References

Geologic formations of Australia
Permian System of Australia
Sandstone formations
Shale formations
Coal in Australia
Geology of New South Wales